St Patrick's University Hospital is a teaching hospital at Kilmainham in Dublin. The building, which is bounded by Steeven's Lane to the east, and Bow Lane West to the south, is managed by St Patrick’s Mental Health Services.

History
The hospital was founded with money bequeathed by the author, Jonathan Swift, following his death as "St. Patrick's Hospital for Imbeciles". He was keen that his hospital be situated close to a general hospital because of the links between physical and mental ill-health, so St. Patrick's was built beside Dr Steevens' Hospital. The hospital, which was designed by George Semple, opened in 1747.

In "Verses on the Death of Dr. Swift", the poet anticipated his own death:

He gave the little Wealth he had,
To build a House for Fools and Mad:
And shew'd by one satyric Touch,
No Nation wanted it so much:
That Kingdom he hath left his Debtor,
I wish it soon may have a Better.

Swift himself was declared of unsound mind by a Commission of Lunacy in 1742. Will Durant said of him: "He went a whole year without uttering a word."

Richard Leeper, who was appointed Resident Medical Superintendent in 1899, introduced a series of important initiatives including providing work and leisure activities for the patients. Norman Moore, who was appointed Resident Medical Superintendent in 1946, introduced occupational therapy, including crafts and farm work to the patients.

After the introduction of deinstitutionalisation in the late 1980s the hospital went into a period of decline. In 2008 the hospital announced the expansion of its outpatient services to a series of regional centres across Ireland. A mental health facility for teenagers known as the "Willow Grove Adolescent Inpatient Unit" opened at the hospital in October 2010.

Services
The hospital, which is affiliated with Trinity College Dublin, has 241 inpatient beds.

References

Further reading

Buildings and structures completed in 1747
Hospital buildings completed in the 18th century
Teaching hospitals in Dublin (city)
Patricks
Teaching hospitals of the University of Dublin, Trinity College